Tsaliet is a river in northern Ethiopia, belonging to the Nile basin. Rising in the mountains of Dogu’a Tembien, where it is first called May Leiba River and then Tinsehe River, it flows westward through a deep gorge, to become Tsaliet in its lower course, where it empties in Weri’i River, just upstream of the main Weri’i bridge along the road to Adwa.

Characteristics 

It is mostly a confined river, locally meandering in its narrow alluvial plain, with an average slope gradient of 25 metres per kilometre. With its tributaries, the river has cut deep gorges. Along the middle of its course, it occupies sandy pediments in Addeha.

Flash floods and flood buffering
Runoff mostly happens in the form of high runoff discharge events that occur in a very short period (called flash floods). These are related to the steep topography, often little vegetation cover and intense convective rainfall. The peaks of such flash floods have often a 50 to 100 times larger discharge than the preceding baseflow.
The magnitude of floods in this river has however been decreased due to interventions in its upper catchment, particularly around the May Leiba reservoir. Physical conservation structures such as stone bunds and check dams intercept runoff. On many steep slopes, exclosures have been established; the dense vegetation largely contributes to enhanced infiltration, less flooding and better baseflow. Examples are the Khunale exclosure and the Harehuwa exclosure.

Irrigated agriculture

Besides springs and reservoirs, irrigation is strongly dependent on the river's baseflow. Such irrigated agriculture is important in meeting the demands for food security and poverty reduction. Irrigated lands are established in the narrow alluvial plains along the river in:
 large lowland irrigation schemes with tropical fruits in Addeha
 spring-based irrigation in Ruba Weyni

Transhumance towards the gorge
The valley bottoms in the gorges of this river have been identified as transhumance destination zones. Transhumance takes place in the summer rainy season, when the lands near the villages are occupied by crops. Young shepherds will take the village cattle down to the gorge and overnight in small caves. The gorges are particularly attractive as a transhumance destination zone, because there is water and good growth of semi-natural vegetation.

Geology

Tsaliet Group
The Tsaliet Group, an older sequence of metamorphic rock is named after the Tsaliet River. Based on crystallisation ages of its rocks in Eritrea and Ethiopia, it is estimated  that the igneous activity occurred between ∼850 and 740 million years ago. The Tsaliet Group has recorded the arc volcanism and the formation of crust that later formed part of the Arabian-Nubian Shield. The Group consists of partially metamorphosed volcanic and sedimentary rocks (impure marble, slate, calcareous siltstone, sericite-chlorite schist, greywacke, and tuff), with a minimum thickness between 1500 and 2500 metres.

Boulders and pebbles in the river bed

From upstream to downstream, the following lithological units occur in the catchment. 
 Phonolite plugs
 Upper basalt
 Interbedded lacustrine deposits
 Lower basalt
 Amba Aradam Formation

 Antalo Limestone
 Quaternary freshwater tufa
 Adigrat Sandstone
 Edaga Arbi Glacials
 Tsaliet metamorphic rock
Logically, in the uppermost stretches of the river, only the pebbles and boulders of the upper lithological units will be present in the river bed, whereas more downstream one may find a more comprehensive mix of all lithologies crossed by the river.

Natural boundary

During its course, this river passes through two woredas and constitutes their boundary over some six kilometres. On the various parts:
 Dogu’a Tembien to the southeast
 Kola Tembien to the northwest

Trekking along the river
Trekking routes have been established across and along this river. The tracks are not marked on the ground but can be followed using downloaded .GPX files.
 Trek 3 follows the river course
 Trek 21 runs at half height on the flanks of the Tsaliet gorge in Haddinnet
 Treks 23 and 26 round the upper catchment 
In the rainy season, flash floods may occur and it is advised not to follow the river bed. At times it may be impossible to cross the river in the rainy season.

See also 
 List of Ethiopian rivers

References

Rivers of Ethiopia
Dogu'a Tembien
Tigray Region
Nile basin